Dagermandaraq (also Romanized as Dagermāndaraq) is a village in Vilkij-e Shomali Rural District, in the Central District of Namin County, Ardabil Province, Iran. At the 2006 census, its population was 518, in 103 families.

References 

Towns and villages in Namin County